Luis Anastasio Somoza Debayle (18 November 1922 – 13 April 1967) was the 26th President of Nicaragua from 21 September 1956 to 1 May 1963.

Somoza Debayle was born in León. At the age of 14, he and his younger brother Anastasio attended Saint Leo College Prep near Tampa, before transferring to La Salle Military Academy on Long Island. Luis was then educated at Louisiana State University, where he was a member of Fi Sigma Alfa Hispanic fraternity. He married Costa Rican Isabel Urcuyo on 9 June 1947, and they had seven children together.

Following the assassination of his father, Anastasio Somoza García, Luis was tapped as acting president, and was elected president in his own right the following year. His rule was somewhat milder than that of his father. However, civil liberties remained restricted, and corruption remained widespread.

His brother, Anastasio Somoza Debayle, headed the National Guard and was the second most powerful man in the country during his older brother's rule. Although Luis declined to run for reelection in 1963, he and Anastasio saw to it that the presidency was held from 1963 onward by politicians loyal to the Somozas. As a result, Luis remained the de facto leader of Nicaragua until his death in 1967, when he suffered a massive heart attack in Managua at the age of 44.

Luis Somoza was the president of the lower chamber of National Congress of Nicaragua 1950-1953 and 1954-1956, and the president of the Senate 1965–1966.

Under Luis Somoza's regime, Nicaragua played a key role leading to the creation of the Central American Common Market, with the Alliance for Progress backing that common market's creation. During the Bay of Pigs Invasion, he allowed the CIA-trained Cuban rebels to embark from Puerto Cabezas, on Nicaragua's Caribbean coast. The Sandinistas began their struggle against the government in 1961—a struggle that would oust his brother in 1979.

He is entombed at Cementerio Occidental with his father, in the National Guard Mausoleum in Managua, Nicaragua. His wife Isabel moved to Houston, Texas in the early 1990s, and died there in 2014.

See also
 National Guard (Nicaragua)
 Somoza family

Footnotes

1922 births
1967 deaths
People from León, Nicaragua
Nationalist Liberal Party politicians
Nicaraguan anti-communists
Nicaraguan people of French descent
Nicaraguan people of Galician descent
Nicaraguan Roman Catholics
Opposition to Fidel Castro
People of the Nicaraguan Revolution
Presidents of Nicaragua
Presidents of the Chamber of Deputies (Nicaragua)
Presidents of the Senate (Nicaragua)
Saint Leo College Preparatory School alumni
Saint Leo University alumni
Luis
Children of national leaders
Grand Crosses Special Class of the Order of Merit of the Federal Republic of Germany
Nicaraguan expatriates in the United States
Burials in Nicaragua